Emil "Tom" Frei III (February 21, 1924 – April 30, 2013) was an American physician and oncologist. He was the former director and former physician-in-chief of the Dana–Farber Cancer Institute in Boston, Massachusetts. He was also the Richard and Susan Smith Distinguished Professor of Medicine at Harvard Medical School.

Early life and education 
Frei was born in 1924 in St. Louis. His family owned the stained glass manufacturer Emil Frei & Associates. Frei completed an accelerated pre-med Colgate University in 1944 after only 2 years of study and his medical degree from Yale University in 1948.

Career 
He interned at Firmin Desloge Hospital, now St. Louis University Hospital in St. Louis, Missouri and served as a physician in the Korean War. He worked at the National Cancer Institute from 1955 to 1965 and the M. D. Anderson Cancer Center from 1965 to 1972; while at M.D. Anderson he was the founding director of the Department of Development Therapeutics, which evolved into the Clinical Research Center. He served as physician-in-chief at the Dana-Farber Institute from 1972 to 1991. He is best known for his work on the treatment of lymphomas and childhood and adult leukemia. His groundbreaking research into then-controversial combination chemotherapy, including the VAMP regimen, earned him many awards.

He coauthored "Cancer Medicine" with Dr. James F. Holland.

Involvement in Cancer Cooperative Group Research
Frei was one of the founders of the Acute Leukemia Group B which later evolved into the Cancer and Leukemia Group B (CALGB). He served as the group chair for 16 years, from 1956 to 1963, and again from 1981 to 1990.

Journal of Clinical Oncology
He coined the Journal of Clinical Oncology in 1981, journal published first issue in 1983 in association with American Society of Clinical Oncology.

Recognition

In 1972 he received the Lasker-DeBakey Clinical Medical Research Award from the Lasker Foundation "for his outstanding contribution in application of the concept of combination chemotherapy for lymphoma and acute adult leukemia." Other awards included the Jeffrey A. Gottlieb Memorial Award (1978); NIH Distinguished Alumni Award (1990); Fellow, American Academy of Arts and Sciences (1999); Pollin Prize for Pediatric Research (2003); and AARC Lifetime Achievement Award (2004).

 2013 Fellow of the AACR Academy
 2004 AACR Lifetime Achievement Award
 1999 Elected Fellow, American Academy of Arts and Sciences
 1997 Elected Member, Institute of Medicine
 1990 First NIH Distinguished Alumni Award
 1989 Armand Hammer Award
 1985 Hamao Umezawa Award, International Society of Chemotherapy, Infection and Cancer
 1983 Charles F. Kettering Prize, General Motors Cancer Research Foundation
 1981 Golden Plate Award of the American Academy of Achievement
 1980 Elected fellow of the American College of Physicians
 1972 Lasker-DeBakey Clinical Medical Research Award
 1971 President, AACR
 1968 President, American Society of Clinical Oncology

Death
Frei died of Parkinson's disease at his home in Oak Park, Illinois on April 30, 2013. He was 89.

See also
 History of cancer chemotherapy

References

External links 
Interview with Emil Frei for the Making Cancer History Voices Collection at the University of Texas

1924 births
2013 deaths
American oncologists
Cancer researchers
Colgate University alumni
Harvard Medical School faculty
People from St. Louis
Yale School of Medicine alumni
Recipients of the Lasker-DeBakey Clinical Medical Research Award
Members of the National Academy of Medicine